Caudanthera is a genus of flowering plants belonging to the family Apocynaceae.

Its native range is Niger to Israel and Northwestern India.

Species:

Caudanthera baradii 
Caudanthera edulis 
Caudanthera mireillae 
Caudanthera sinaica

References

Apocynaceae
Apocynaceae genera